Sorry, Little Sarah is the first single from the Blue System's debut album, Walking On A Rainbow. It was published in 1987 by Hanseatic M.V. and was distributed by BMG. The lyrics, music, arrangements and production was made by Dieter Bohlen, and the co-production by Luis Rodríguez. This song has a strong bossa nova influence.

What Dieter Bohlen has said about this song, "After Modern Talking, I thought for a long time what I could do now, and we never had a Samba hit in Germany. So it was, for me, a big challenge to write a Samba title."

Track listing 

7" Single Hansa 109 469 año 1987

Sorry Little Sarah		3:35
Big Boys Don't Cry		3:11

12" Maxi Hansa 609 469 año 1987

Sorry Little Sarah (Long Version)		5:12
Big Boys Don't Cry (Long Version)		5:24

12" Maxi Hansa 609 640 año 1987

Sorry Little Sarah (New York Dance Mix)		5:58
Big Boys Don't Cry (Long Version)		5:24

Charts

References

Blue System songs
1987 debut singles
Songs written by Dieter Bohlen
Song recordings produced by Dieter Bohlen
Ariola Records singles
1987 songs